Antz is a video game developed by French studio Planet Interactive and released in 1999 by Infogrames for the Game Boy Color. It is based on the film of the same name.

Reception

The game received "mixed" reviews according to the review aggregation website GameRankings.

Lauren Fielder, writing for GameSpot, concluded that "Antz on the GBC is another platform game that will amuse those who find the genre enjoyable in small scale 8-bit." IGN said, "This game is perfect for kids -- and I'm sure this game was aimed for that market: parents head to the store, see a name they recognize (Antz), pick up the game and give it to their Game Boy-playing child. The kid likes the game because it's easy to control and play. My problem is this: Antz really wasn't a kids' movie -- it was a Woody Allen flick. Hey, maybe they should make a game based on Sleeper or, better yet, Everything You Always Wanted to Know About Sex* (*But Were Afraid to Ask). Antz isn't terrible, but it won't bowl you over with originality." AllGame said, "Overall, this is really a middle-of-the-road game. Not bad, but not great either. It's worth a rental or a bargain bin purchase."

References

External links
 

1999 video games
Game Boy Color games
Antz
Antz video games
Infogrames games
Game Boy Color-only games
Video games about insects
Video games developed in France
Video games based on films
Video games set in New York City
Multiplayer and single-player video games
Planet Interactive Development games